Bibasis anadi, the plain orange awlet, is a species of hesperid butterfly found in India and Southeast Asia. The butterfly has been reassigned by Vane-Wright and de Jong (2003) to the genus Burara and is considered by them Burara anadi.

Range
The plain orange awlet ranges from India, (Mussoorie, Sikkim eastwards through Assam), to the Karen Hills in Myanmar, northern Thailand and Laos.

Status
The species is considered rare.

Description

The butterfly has a wingspan of 50 to 55 mm.

Edward Yerbury Watson (1891) gives a detailed description:

Habits
This butterfly is crepuscular.

Cited references

See also
Hesperiidae
Coeliadinae
List of butterflies of India (Coeliadinae)
List of butterflies of India (Hesperiidae)

References

Print

Watson, E. Y. (1891) Hesperiidae indicae. Vest and Co. Madras.

Online

Brower, Andrew V. Z. and Warren, Andrew, (2007). Coeliadinae Evans 1937. Version 21 February 2007 (temporary). http://tolweb.org/Coeliadinae/12150/2007.02.21 in The Tree of Life Web Project, http://tolweb.org/

Bibasis
Butterflies of Asia
Butterflies described in 1883
Butterflies of Indochina
Taxa named by Lionel de Nicéville